Timeline of Newport, Rhode Island.

17th century
 1639 - William Coddington settles.
 1643 - First Society of Friends established (approximate date).
 1644
 Newport becomes part of the Colony of Rhode Island and Providence Plantations.
 Name changed from Aquidneck
 United Baptist Church founded.
 1647 - Friends' Burial Ground established.
 1654 - Thames Street laid out.
 1656 - Second Baptist Church established.
 1663 - Easton's windmill built.
 1673 - White Horse Tavern enlarged into a tavern.
 1675 - Clifton Burying Ground established.
 1677
 Jewish Cemetery dedicated.
 Stone mill in operation (approximate date).
 1681 - Custom-house established.
 1690 - Town House built.
 1695 - First Congregational Church established.
 1697 - Mumford house (residence) built (approximate date).
 1699 - Great Friends Meeting House built.

18th century
 1703 - Fort built on Goat Island (approximate date).
 1705 - John Stevens stonecarving shop in business.
 1723 - July 19: Pirates hanged on Gravelly point.
 1726 - Trinity Church built.
 1727 - James Franklin sets up printing press.
 1730
 Literary and Philosophical Society organized.
 Seventh Day Baptist Meeting House built.
 White Horse Tavern in business.
 Population: 4,640.
 1732 - Rhode Island Gazette newspaper begins publication.
 1733 - Organ installed in Trinity Church.
 1735 - Clarke Street Meeting House built.
 1740 - January: Snow storm.
 1741
 State House built.
 Artillery Company of Newport chartered.
 1743 - Middletown separates from Newport.
 1746 - Almshouse built.
 1747 - Redwood Library established.
 1749 - Lighthouse built.
 1750 - Fire company organized.
 1752
 Marine society established.
 Hunter's Dispensary in business.
 1755 - Aaron Lopez (merchant) in business.
 1758 - Newport Mercury newspaper begins publication.
 1760 - Francis Malbone House and John Tillinghast House built.
 1761
 Jewish Club organized.
 Douglass travelling theatre troupe performs.
 1762 - Brick Market built.
 1763 - Touro Synagogue and Granary built.
 1764 - Shots fired at HMS St John.
 1765
 June: Demonstration against impressment.
 August 27: Protest against Stamp Act.
 1774 - Population: 9,209.
 1776
 December 8: British occupation begins.
 Population: 5,229.
 1778
 August 29: Battle of Rhode Island
 December: Snow storm.
 1779 - October 25: British occupation ends.
 1780
 July 12: French troops arrive.
 Charles Feke apothecary in business.
 Clarke Cooke House built.
 Free African Union Society founded
 1781
 March 6: George Washington visits Rochambeau in Newport.
 French troops depart.
 1784
 City incorporated.
 George Hazard becomes mayor.
 Goat Island sold to U.S. military.
 1787 - Town government resumes.
 1788 - Brissot de Warville finds "houses falling to ruin and grass growing in the public square" and Population: "less than 6000".
 1790
 August 17: George Washington visits Newport.
 Population: 6,716.
 1792 - Newport Association of Mechanics and Manufacturers incorporated.
 1799
 Fort Adams built.
 Yellow fever epidemic.

19th century
 1803 - Newport National Bank incorporated.
 1805 - First Methodist Episcopal Church established.
 1810 - Spencer's variety store in business.
 1811
 Hammond's Circulating Library in business.
 Samuel Whitehorne House built.
 1814 - Sherman & Co. grocers in business.
 1815 - September 23: Gale.
 1819
 Newport Asylum built on Coasters' Harbor Island.
 Savings Bank of Newport incorporated.
 1823 - Newport Harbor Lighthouse built.
 1828 - Mechanics' Library established.
 1831 - Newport Steam Factory built.
 1832 - Cozzens carpet shop in business.
 1833 - June 19: Andrew Jackson visits Newport.
 1834 - Zion Episcopal Church built.
 1835
 Davis' Family Bakery in business.
 Perry Cotton Mill built.
 1837 - Coddington cotton mill built.
 1838 - Armory built.
 1839 - Kingscote (mansion) built.
 1845
 Ocean House hotel in business.
 Old Colony Railroad begins
 1846
 The Newport Daily News begins publication.
 First Baptist Church building and Van Zandt house constructed.
 1847
 Central Baptist Chursh established.
 Hazard grocery and Langley & Bennett in business.
 1851 - Beechwood (mansion) built.
 1852
 Street lighting by gas lamp begins (approximate date).
 Chateau-sur-Mer (residence) built.
 St. Mary's Church completed.
 1853
 City incorporated again.
 Robert B. Cranston becomes mayor.
 Church of the Holy Name of Mary built.
 1854
 Newport Historical Society and Newport Reading Room founded.
 Sisters of Mercy convent built.
 Lighthouse commissioned on Lime Rock.
 1855 - Touro Park established.
 1857 - United Congregational Church built.
 1859 - August 23: Reunion of the Sons and Daughters of Newport.
 1860 - Chepstow (mansion) built.
 1861 - Kaull & Anthony grocers in business.
 1862 - Nason upholstery in business.
 1863 - School house built on Willow Street.
 1864
 Old Colony and Newport Railway begins operating.
 Shiloh Baptist Church organized.
 1865
 Newport Free Library and Reading Room established, first public library in Rhode Island.
 Young Men's Christian Organization formed with the goal to gather books for a library.
 Newport Light Infantry formed.
 Scott grocery in business.
 1866 - Atlantic House roller skating rink opens.
 1867
 Young Men's Christian Organization disbanded.
 Newport Free Library and Reading Room Incorporated.
 Frasch confectionery in business.
 Opera house established.
 1869
 People's Library Incorporated
 U.S. Naval Torpedo Station established on Goat Island.
 August: Ulysses S. Grant visits Newport.
 1870
 Rose Island Light built.
 The People's Free Library, later the Newport Public Library opens at its new location on Thames Street on May 4 completing the merger with the Newport Free Library and Reading Room.
 Newport & Wickford Railroad and Steamboat Company organized.
 Population - 12,521.
 1871 - Newport Manufacturing Company mill built.
 1873
 Newport Hospital opens.
 Rogers High School founded.
 1874 - Ward's Circulating Library in business.
 1875 - Population: 14,028.
 1876 - International Polo Cup match held.
 1878
 Young Men's Christian Association re-organized.
 King & McLeod (dry goods) and Marshall & Flynn (printer) in business.
 1880
 Channing Memorial Church and Newport Casino built.
 May 30: The League of American Wheelmen is formed in Newport
 Population - 15,693.
 1881
 City water system authorized.
 Newport Skating Rink opens.
 Tennis tournament begins at Newport Casino.
 Groff pharmacy in business.
 1882
 Couzens and Bull telephone exchange in business.
 Free Chapel of St. John the Evangelist established.
 Vinland Estate built.
 1883 - Isaac Bell House built.
 1884
 Naval War College established.
 July 4: Reunion of the Sons and Daughters of Newport.
 1885
 St. Joseph's Church established.
 Morton Park established (approximate date).
 Stone Tower restored.
 1888 - Carr bookseller and Hass florist in business.
 1889 - Electric trolley begins operating.
 1890's - Bailey's Beach founded.
 1891 - Rockhurst (residence) built.
 1892 - Marble House, Ochre Court, and Rough Point built.
 1893
 Newport Country Club established.
 Old Colony Railroad stops operations.
 1894 - Belcourt Castle (residence) built.
 1895 - National Open Golf Championship held at Newport Country Club.
 The Breakers (residence) built.
 1896 - St. George's School established near Newport.
 1898 - Vernon Court (residence) built.
 1899 - September 7: Automobile parade.
 1900 - Rhode Island state capital relocates to Providence.

20th century

 1901
- The Elms (residence) built.
- TJ Brown in business.
 1902 - Newport Historical Society Museum building and Oelrichs House constructed.
 1905
 Civic League formed.
 Population: 25,039.
 1908 - Cardines Field baseball stadium is opened.
 1910 - Population: 27,149.
 1912 - Art Association of Newport organized.
 1915 - Miramar (mansion) built.
 1919
 Seamen's Church Institute founded.
 U.S. Navy sex scandal.
 1923 - Rhode Island Route 114 designated.
 1925 - Seaview Terrace (residence) built.
 1926 - Hotel Viking (hotel) opens.
 1926 - Courthouse built on Washington Square.
 1930 - America's Cup yacht race relocates to Newport.
 1934 - Salve Regina University chartered.
 1937 - Population: 27,612.
 1938 - September: Hurricane.
 1942 - Naval Academy Preparatory School relocates to Newport.
 1946 - United Baptist Church established.
 1948 - WADK radio (1540 AM) begins broadcasting as WRJM.  Call Letters changed to WADK in November 1953.
 1950 - Naval Justice School relocates to Newport.
 1953 - September 12: wedding of John Fitzgerald Kennedy and Jacqueline Bouvier at St. Mary's Church.
 1954
 Newport Jazz Festival begins.
 Tennis Hall of Fame established.
 1959
 Newport Folk Festival begins.
 Rovensky Park established.
 1960 - Population: 47,049.
 1964 - Newport State Airport (Rhode Island) in operation.
 1965 
 Fort Adams State Park established.
 Folk singer Bob Dylan performs a controversial but influential electric folk-rock concert at the Newport Folk Festival.
 1969 
 Newport Bridge opens.
 Newport Folk Festival held for the final time before a 16-year hiatus.
 1972 - Newport Jazz Festival moves to New York City
 1976 - Brenton Point State Park established.
 1978 - Naval War College Museum in operation.
 1980 - Newport Rugby Football Club (Rhode Island) formed.
 1981 - Newport Jazz Festival re-established at Fort Adams.
 1983 
 New York Yacht Club loses the America's cup to the Royal Perth Yacht Club
 Sail Newport established
 1985 - Newport Folk Festival re-established at Fort Adams.
 1993 - Yacht Restoration School founded.
 1998
 Newport International Film Festival begins.
 SVF Foundation established (livestock preservation).
 2000 - National Museum of American Illustration opens.

21st century

 2004 - City website online (approximate date).
 2010 - Population: 24,672.
 2012 - October: Hurricane Sandy storm surge washes away large sections of the Cliff Walk
 2014 - June: The Cliff Walk reopens after restoration following 2012's storm damage by Hurricane Sandy
 2020 - March: Due to the COVID-19 pandemic, all dine-in restaurants, bars, movie theaters, and all gatherings of 25 or more are banned in Newport and across the state. This brings a halt to nearly all concerts, sports, and other events. Newport mansions are closed.
 2022 - March: A 20-foot section of the Ciff Walk collapses near Narragansett Avenue and Webster Street and is closed

See also
 Newport history
 Timeline of Providence, Rhode Island

References

Bibliography

Published in the 18th-19th century
 
 
 
 
 
 
 
 
 
 
 
 
 
 
 
 

Published in the 20th century
 
 
 
 
 
  + Chronology

Images

External links

 Works related to Newport, RI, various dates (via Digital Public Library of America).
 

.
Narragansett Bay
Newport
newport
Years in Rhode Island